A by-election was held for the Australian House of Representatives seat of Barker on 13 October 1956. This was triggered by the death of Liberal MP and Speaker Archie Cameron.

The by-election was won by Liberal candidate Jim Forbes. William McAnaney, a future state Liberal MP, who had been chairman of the District Council of Strathalbyn, unsuccessfully contested the by-election as an independent.

Results

References

1956 elections in Australia
South Australian federal by-elections